RMSP can mean:
Republican Main Street Partnership
Royal Mail Steam Packet Company
Rail Motor Stopping Place
Região Metropolitana de São Paulo